Bloom Institute of Technology, also known as BloomTech, is a for-profit online coding bootcamp. At launch, it gained attention for being the first bootcamp to offer income share agreements as a method of financing. It was known as Lambda School from 2017 through 2021.

History 
BloomTech was founded by Austen Allred and Ben Nelson in 2017 as Lambda School. Nelson was an instructor for the code bootcamp DevMountain, and Allred was a manager at the payday loan company LendUp. BloomTech began as a single short course in functional programming. The previous name Lambda refers to lambda functions, a concept in functional programming. The company offers online coding programs in Full Stack Web Development, Data Science, Backend Development and Web3.

BloomTech joined Y Combinator in 2017, and raised seed capital in 2018 from Ashton Kutcher's Sound Ventures, Gmail creator Paul Bucheit, and Zynga co-founder Justin Waldron. In January 2019, investors including Google Ventures, Y Combinator, and Ashton Kutcher placed $30 million in BloomTech investments. Enrollment was 700 in October 2018 and 2,700 in mid-September, at which point enrollment was expanding by 10 percent a month. By 2019, the curriculum had expanded to a full nine-month course, longer than most comparable bootcamps.

As of February 2020, over $48 million in venture funding had been raised and the school was valued at $150 million. However, that April, the company announced a layoff of 19 employees, explaining the decision as an effort to focus. In August 2020, the company raised a $74 million Series C. In April 2021, the company laid off 65 employees.

In November 2021, the company rebranded as BloomTech.

In December of 2022, the company laid off 88 employees, half of its staff at the time.

Funding and payment model 

As of 2019, unlike the majority of education institutions where tuition payments are collected up front, BloomTech began offering an income share agreement (ISA) model. In this scheme, students paid no tuition upfront, instead providing a percentage of future income after acquiring employment. Its payment structured has changed over time. Until Fall of 2021, students paid 17% of income after acquiring a job that pays over $50,000 in the technology field, ending after either $30,000 or 24 months of 17% payments, or after 5 years without a job in the technology sector.

In Fall of 2021 the terms were significantly changed. Customers who sign up for an ISA currently pay $2,950 upfront. Once they make $50,000 in any job, including outside the field of technology, they pay 14% of their income for four years, maxing out at $42,950. These contracts last up to eight years.

BloomTech sells ISAs to investors in its students future earnings in order to acquire up-front capital. In August 2018, half of BloomTech's ISAs were purchased by a hedge fund for $10,000 per ISA, according to internal investor communications documents. As of 2019, half of ISAs were traded to investors, providing upfront capital in exchange for a discount on their expected long-term returns for those purchasing those assets. In December 2019, the company partnered with Edly, a digital marketplace for accredited investors to trade BloomTech ISAs started by Chris Ricciardi. After criticism from students and Twitter users, BloomTech removed all statements about this partnership from their website.

In December 2021 the company lowered its tuition to $22,500 for its core programs in Full Stack Web Development, Data Science and Backend Development. At that time BloomTech marketed a "tuition refund guarantee," saying students would receive a refund of 110% of their tuition if they did not receive a job making $50K or more per year within a year of graduating. However, the offer drew criticism in the tech community for its onerous requirements: a graduate must apply to ten jobs every week, and make five open source code contributions every week, for one year.

Leadership 
Allred has cultivated a popular social media following, making statements about BloomTech and other topics on his Twitter account. The Verge notes that Allred has been highly engaged on the site, responding to almost any critiques of BloomTech. Between leaving his previous startup and launching BloomTech, Allred co-wrote a book called Secret Sauce: The Ultimate Growth Hacking Guide, which described strategies for SEO, content marketing, landing pages, and gaining followers on social media.

Austen has been accused of deceptive practices such as cherry picking. When asked about the number of students hired from BloomTech's UX program he said, "Hit 100% hired but was VERY small sample size," but internal communication revealed that only a single student in the program had graduated.

For a few months in 2013, Allred camped out of his car while in Silicon Valley, and frequently describes this period as having been homeless. However, a deleted post on his blog titled "Voluntarily Homeless in Silicon Valley" explains that he lived out of a car by choice. Motivations included not wanting to pay for rent in San Francisco as he searched for investors, and an "obsession with minimalism." While his statements years later suggest it was a hardship, earlier statements describe the experience as positive and motivational. "I had a half dozen people offer to let me stay at their place or crash on their couch rent-free. I was certainly grateful for their hospitality, however self-sufficiency, even if it comes to the extent of living in a car and scalping soccer tickets for a living, feels completely different than being a welfare case."

Controversies 

In May 2021, three former students brought suits against the company for a number of misrepresentations, including operating illegally without informing students, and misrepresenting their job placement rates. In April 2022, another former student filed a lawsuit for the same misrepresentations, this time adding Allred as a defendant.

Quality of Education 

Former students have criticized the quality of training. In late 2019, BloomTech launched a User Experience track to poor results. In the first cohort, only a single student graduated. In the following cohort, the students complained to the staff about haphazard, poorly organized instruction. Staff denied there were any issues for several months, telling students, "Trust the process." Following reporting by The Verge, the company shut down the UX track.

In November 2020, the program underwent drastic changes. The length was shortened from nine months to six, and Team Leads (paid staff analogous to Teaching Assistants) were removed from the program. In the new system, students in later units would fill that role for those in earlier units, and homework would automatically be graded via software. Students complained they would go weeks without feedback, and could skip lectures and projects without consequences.

Illegal Operation 

According to California Education Code, all private postsecondary schools (such as BloomTech) must register with the state and wait for approval before operation. This allows the state to act on student complaints, and periodically review a school's curriculum and marketing material. Should a school operate illegally, then any loans or other debt the school may claim against students is unenforceable.

For its first two years, BloomTech did not seek any form of approval and operated illegally. In March 2019, California's BPPE consumer protection bureau fined BloomTech $75,000, and ordered them to cease operations. The company continued to operate illegally through August 2020, when it was approved for operation after agreeing to not offer income share agreements in the state.

During this period, the state of California had no authority to act on student complaints. "We only have jurisdiction over approved schools. Therefore, any complaints students may wish to file with the Bureau will fall outside the Bureau's jurisdiction because Lambda School was not approved at the time of their enrollment."

While California law implies that any students who attended BloomTech prior to August 2020 owe the company nothing, BloomTech continues to enforce their income share agreements. The debate is an ongoing matter in arbitration, as the company requires that students sign arbitration agreements as part of enrollment.

Job Placement Rates 

In 2019 BloomTech (while still going by the name Lambda School) claimed, "86% of Lambda School graduates are hired within 6 months, and make over $50k a year." However, a leaked memo to investors said, "We’re at roughly 50% placement for cohorts that are 6 months graduated." Shortly after the news about the discrepancy, the company published their own outcomes report, claiming 71% job placement. However, they arrived at that number by removing the "$50k a year" qualifier. They also chose not to count students who they determine to be not job seeking.

In February 2021 BloomTech leaders informed all staff that "qualified job placements" (those making $50,000) were 27% at six months post graduation.   When the slides from the presentation leaked in 2021, a representative said that those numbers were inaccurate, but could not explain why the COO would present inaccurate numbers to the entire company at an all-hands meeting.

In 2022 BloomTech released their 2021 outcomes report. The report claimed a 90% placement rate for graduates, and a $65,000 median salary for graduates in their first job after graduation. However, the company reached those numbers by not counting 37% of graduates in the total, claiming they are not job seeking. Only 45% of graduates are offered jobs over $50,000 a year. 17% of job placements took longer more than six months from graduation. The report leaves critical details ambiguous; for example, it counts a job offer as a placement, not the acceptance of the offer. By this criteria, a graduate offered an unfeasible job (e.g. requires relocation) counts as a successful placement, even if the graduate rejects it.

Labor Law Violations 

In Fall of 2020, the company piloted a program called "Lambda Fellows" where, as part of their training, students would spend several weeks working at a company without compensation. Afterwards, the company could elect to either hire the student (thereby paying BloomTech via its ISA) or decline and pay nothing. BloomTech marketed the product to companies with, "Try out our talented engineers risk free for 4 weeks." At launch, its FAQ explained, "Is this a paid program? This program is part of Lambda School for the Fellow and as such, is not paid." Paul Graham, an early investor, said, "Imagine how much easier hiring decisions would become if you could try out a programmer for four weeks before hiring them."

The program was publicly announced in November 2020. It was immediately criticized as unethical if not illegal under The Fair Labor Standards Act. Following the extremely negative reception, the program was changed to pay interns.

Misrepresenting Debt 

In April 2021, California's Department of Financial Protection and Innovation reached a settlement with BloomTech over misrepresenting the type of debt students were entering. The contracts stated, "this extension of credit is a qualified educational loan and is subject to the limitations on dischargeability in bankruptcy contained in Section 523(a)(8) of the United States Bankruptcy Code." This was false, and lead students to believe that it was impossible to discharge their debt.

As part of the settlement, the company was required to notify students of the inaccuracy, hire a third party to review its contracts for accuracy, and undergo a review of existing marketing material. The company issued their own press release on the settlement, which the DFPI determined to be deceptive. "DFPI asked Lambda to correct the mischaracterization in the blog post, and Lambda agreed. However, because the misleading blog post contradicts the consent order and Lambda’s agreement to ensure its marketing is accurate and not likely to mislead consumers, DFPI urges consumers to exercise caution when evaluating marketing and contracts for financial products and services offered by Lambda."

Rebranding 

In 2019, the AI infrastructure company Lambda Labs brought a trademark lawsuit against BloomTech, then "Lambda School." Labs alleged that the name caused confusion, and it may be harmed by the controversies surrounding BloomTech's business. As the case continued, Labs argued that BloomTech's 2020 controversies damaged the goodwill of the "Lambda" name, by virtue of the negative press. In July 2021, the two parties reached an undisclosed settlement.

That November, BloomTech announced its new name, along with changes to its financing options. Journalists noted the rebrand made sense in lieu of its new emphasis on loans, but the new name could also distance the company from previous controversies. "The name change could thus shake off some of the baggage the bootcamp has been holding onto (and help it attract more students)."

References 

For-profit schools in the United States
2017 introductions
Coding schools